Kevin Shinners (born 24 March 1945) is a former Australian rules footballer who played with Richmond in the Victorian Football League (VFL).

Shinners was recruited from Dandenong. He played 17 games for Richmond in the 1967 VFL season, including their semi final win over Carlton, but missed out on participating in the grand final, which they won. He was called up to the seniors just six times in 1968.

He continued at Dandenong after leaving Richmond and also spent some time with Rochester in the Bendigo Football League, winning a Michelsen Medal in 1970.

References

Links
Kevin Shinners Profile at Tigerland Archive

1945 births
Australian rules footballers from Victoria (Australia)
Richmond Football Club players
Dandenong Football Club players
Rochester Football Club players
Living people